James Wagner may refer to:

 James Elvin Wagner (1873–1969), American clergyman
 James Wagner (poet) (born 1969), American poet
 James W. Wagner (born 1953), president of Emory University, Atlanta, Georgia